Vojščica is a village southeast of Kostanjevica in the Municipality of Miren-Kostanjevica in the Littoral region of Slovenia close to the border with Italy.

The parish church in the settlement is dedicated to Saint Vitus and belongs to the Diocese of Koper.

References

External links

Vojščica on Geopedia

Populated places in the Municipality of Miren-Kostanjevica